Yael Naim (born 6 February 1978) is a French-born Israeli singer and actress. She rose to fame in 2008 in the US after her hit single "New Soul" was used by Apple in an advertising campaign for its MacBook Air. The song peaked at No. 7 on the Billboard Hot 100.

Life and career
Yael Naim was born in Paris, France to Maghrebi Jewish immigrants from Tunisia. At the age of four, she moved with her family to Ramat HaSharon, Israel, where she spent the rest of her childhood. She served in the Israel Defense Forces as a soloist in the Israeli Air Force Orchestra.

She began her singing career with a part in the musical  and her first solo album, In a Man's Womb (recorded in Los Angeles with Kamil Rustam), was released in 2001. She also sang the song "You Disappear" by Bruno Coulais for the film Harrison's Flowers. In her early work, she was credited simply as Yael. She also performed a duet with Din Din Aviv titled "Mashmauyot". Her version of the Britney Spears song "Toxic" also garnered significant attention.

Naim joined with percussionist  and, over a period of two years, they arranged and recorded thirteen of Naim's songs in a studio in her apartment in Paris. These were released as her second album, Yael Naim, on 22 October 2007, on the  label. The songs are in French, English, and Hebrew and received critical acclaim. The album entered the French album chart at No. 11 the week after its release. Her style has been described as having a touch of folk and a touch of jazz, with mysterious and evocative words sung with a delicate and intentionally husky voice.

In January 2008, Apple featured her song "New Soul" in its debut commercial for the MacBook Air laptop. Steve Jobs himself picked the song for the launch of the laptop line. Owing to high U.S. digital sales, the song debuted on the Billboard Hot 100 for the chart week of 16 February 2008, at No. 9, becoming Naim's first U.S. top ten single, and making her the first Israeli solo artist to ever have a top ten hit in the United States. "New Soul" moved up to No. 7 the following week. The song was also featured on the soundtrack of the movies The House Bunny and Wild Target. Her third album was released in November 2010. The first single from this new record was "Go to the River".

She previously won the award in 2011.

Personal life

Discography

Studio albums

Singles

 2001 – "You Disappear"
 2001 – "Do I Do"
 2001 – "Avril"
 2007 – "Toxic" (SPAIN Peak #35)
 2008 – "Too Long"
 2009 – "Far Far"
 2010 – "Go to the River"
 2010 – "The Only One"
 2011 – "Come Home"
 2015 – "Dream in My Head" (FRANCE Peak: #77)
 2015 – "Coward" (FRANCE Peak: #123)

Awards and nominations

Television
Naim's voice was used in a Season 21 episode of The Simpsons, entitled "The Greatest Story Ever D'ohed". She voiced Dorit, the niece of an Israeli tour guide named Jakob (voiced by Sacha Baron Cohen).

Her single "Come Home" was in an episode of Season 7 of Grey's Anatomy and in episode 6 of the ABC Family series Switched at Birth. Also, her cover of Irene Cara's "Flashdance (What a Feeling)" was used in the promotion video of The Voice UK in 2014.

Philanthropy 
On 27 November 2015, she participated together with Nolwenn Leroy and Camélia Jordana at the national memorial day for the victims of the November 2015 Paris attacks singing the song "" from Jacques Brel.

References

External links

Official website
Official blog
Yael Naim's 'New Soul' Review on Daily Music Guide
Official biography  (French)

"Nice to meet you" – article about Yael Naim on NRG.il (Hebrew)
Yael Naim at NPR Music
"Cinderella Song" – Interview with Yael Naim in Ha'aretz by Tidhar Wald 

1978 births
Living people
Actresses from Paris
Atlantic Records artists
English-language singers from France
English-language singers from Israel
French emigrants to Israel
20th-century French Sephardi Jews
French people of Tunisian-Jewish descent
French voice actresses
21st-century Israeli women singers
Israeli voice actresses
Israeli pop singers
Jewish folk singers
Musicians from Paris
People from Ramat HaSharon
Ukulele players
21st-century French women singers